Pentalobus barbatus is a beetle species of the genus Pentalobus of the family Passalidae.

References

Passalidae
Beetles described in 1801